BYHOURS is a Spanish company and hotel microstay platform offering hotel stays by the hour. Guests book the hotel for a specific time of arrival and a duration of 3, 6, or 24 hours.

History 
The company was founded in March 2012 by Christian Rodríguez and Guillermo Gaspart in Barcelona, Catalonia, Spain. The company raised €600K seed funding from Caixa Capital and Cabiedes Partners in July 2013. In 2014, according to Travelmole, over 150,000 bookings were made through BYHOURS at over 1,500 hotels in Spain. In 2018, the company reached the first million hours booked in their platform. During 2019, BYHOURS opened a new office in Mexico City, Mexico, and started its new expansion project in Latin America and the United States. 

BYHOURS currently has about 60 employees based at its Barcelona headquarters and Mexico City office. BYHOURS offers more than 4,000 hotels by the hour in more than 24 countries around the world and about 600 destinations throughout Europe, Latin America and in travel hubs in the Middle East. The platform has also a mobile application available on Android and iOS.

Funding 
In July 2013, BYHOURS raised €600K seed funding from Caixa Capital and Cabiedes Partners. In April 2014, the company received a funding 2.6 million from Spanish investors. In August 2016, BYHOURS has also received 1.5 million from European funds and in November 2017, the company was announced a funding 3 million from new international investors as well as existing ones. In January 2020, BYHOURS closed €8M funding round to continue to grow in Europe, Latin America and the Middle East, as well as expand into the United States.

Awards and recognition 
 Best Startup of the Year in 2012 Spain at Ecommerce awards.
 Received  2014 as the Best App of the Year in Spain
 Won the first prize in the travel and tourism web shop category
 Winner of 2017 Overall Awards – Best Business & Productivity App of 2017
 2nd Best APP in #Startmeapp (Huawei and El Pais)
 Best Mobile App Awards 2018
 eCommerce Awards 2018
 National Marketing Awards 2018
 South Summit – Startup Travel Category 2018
 StartupsFights of Deloitte 2018
 Caixa Bank Hotel & Tourism Awards 2018 and 2019
 ITH Smart Destination Awards 2019
 Pyme of the Year, Carles Ferrer Salat Awards 2019

References

External links
 

Travel and holiday companies of Spain
Online travel agencies
Travel technology
Hospitality companies established in 2012